Dimitrije Bodi (1850–1942) was a Serbian journalist and diplomat. Born into an affluent family in Belgrade of Aromanian descent, he studied law at the Belgrade Great School and at the universities of Leipzig, Berlin and Paris. From 1880 to 1885 he was a writer, secretary and chargé d'affaires at the Serbian embassy at Sofia, interrupted by the Serbo-Bulgarian War, then returned to Sofia in October 1886. He was appointed the first Serbian Consul in Bitola, and arrived on 9 April 1889 with Vice-Consul Petar Manojlović. He was the Serbian Consul in Bitola between 1889 and 1895. Branislav Nušić (1864–1938) was a secretary at the consulate during his office.

References

Sources

19th-century Serbian lawyers
20th-century Serbian lawyers
Diplomats from Belgrade
Journalists from Belgrade
People from the Kingdom of Serbia
People of the Kingdom of Yugoslavia
Serbian people of Aromanian descent
1850 births
1942 deaths